is a former Japanese football player.

Career
After just five seasons as a professional footballer, Minegishi announced his retirement in December 2018.

Club statistics
Updated to 23 February 2019.

References

External links

Profile at Zweigen Kanazawa

1991 births
Living people
Kokushikan University alumni
Association football people from Miyagi Prefecture
Japanese footballers
J2 League players
J3 League players
Zweigen Kanazawa players
Azul Claro Numazu players
Association football defenders